Alexander Joseph Guerra (born September 3, 1988) is a baseball coach and former infielder, who is the current head baseball coach of the Radford Highlanders. He played college baseball at Greensboro in 2007 and 2008 before transferring to Radford from 2009 to 2011.

Playing career
Guerra grew up in Wantagh, New York, where he attended Wantagh High School, where he was a letterwinner in baseball and football. Guerra would go on to play college baseball for the Greensboro College Pride. He appeared in 16 games for the Pride in 2007. After sitting out the 2009 season due to transferring, Guerra had a .305 batting average, a .394 on-base percentage (OBP), and a .440 SLG, with five home runs. As a senior in 2011, Guerra batted .317 with a .486 SLG, 6 home runs, and 47 RBIs.

Coaching career
Guerra started his coaching career as director of baseball operations for the UCF Knights in 2012, before moving into a volunteer role in 2013, working with Knights hitters and catchers. He would return to Radford in the summer of 2013, joining the team as an assistant coach. After two seasons, at his alma mater, he took the top assistant role at James Madison.

Guerra was named the head coach of the Radford Highlanders in late June, 2022.

Head coaching record

References

External links
Radford Highlanders bio

1988 births
Living people
Greensboro Pride baseball players
James Madison Dukes baseball coaches
Radford Highlanders baseball coaches
Radford Highlanders baseball players
UCF Knights baseball coaches
Sportspeople from Nassau County, New York
Baseball coaches from New York (state)
People from Wantagh, New York